Charles Roger Radebe (born 16 December 1995) is a South African professional rugby union player who most recently playing for the . He usually plays on the wing.

Rugby career

2013–2014 : Schools and Under-19 rugby

Radebe first earned a provincial selection in 2013, when he represented the George-based  at the Under-18 Academy Week held at Glenwood High School in Durban. He helped his side to victories in all three their matches, scoring a try in their 32–7 victory over Eastern Province in their final match.

He again represented  in the 2014 Under-19 Provincial Championship. He didn't play in their first match, but featured in their remaining six matches, starting five of those. SWD failed to qualify for the semi-finals, however, finishing in sixth position on the log.

2015 : SWD Eagles

Despite still being in the Under-20 age group, Radebe was included in the ' squad for their 2015 Currie Cup qualification campaign. The SWD Eagles finished bottom of the log, therefore failing to progress to the 2015 Currie Cup Premier Division, instead qualifying to the First Division. Radebe started this match and scored another try to help his side to a 47–40 victory to qualify for the final. Radebe's five tries made him the SWD Eagles' top scorer in the competition and joint-second overall behind the Leopards' Juan Language.

2016–present : Southern Kings

References

South African rugby union players
Living people
1995 births
People from Oudtshoorn
Rugby union wings
SWD Eagles players
Southern Kings players
Rugby union players from the Western Cape